Sarawak Music Awards is a music award held in the Malaysian state of Sarawak. It is divided into three major events that are given the most attention by the fans, media, and record companies in Sarawak. Shortlisted as the Anugerah Musik Dayak (AMD) awards, Anugerah Juara Rentak Ruai (AJARR) awards and the Anugerah Carta Sapa Juara (ACSJ) awards. Presented by different organization dedicated to promoting the diversity of music in Sarawak and to acknowledging the talents and contributions of the local entertainer.

The first music award is the Anugerah Juara Rentak Ruai (AJARR) presented annually by Cats FM radio station, a subsidiary of Kristal Harta Sdn Bhd since 2003 until 2012, with the support of the Ministry of Tourism Sarawak . The nominations were based on the first 12 songs which have been ranked at No 1 with the longest durations accumulated in twelve months and the winner will be judged by a group of professional jury.
The second music awards, Anugerah Musik Dayak (AMD) - Dayak Music Awards ceremony was held in 2008 in Kuching, Sarawak and continuously presented on every two consecutive years. The awards program was founded by Snowdan Lawan and managed by a nonprofit organization, Dayak Artistes and Musicians Association (DAMA).
The third music awards is the Anugerah Carta Sapa Juara (ACSJ) awards which is wholly owned and staged by the Sarawak Radio Televisyen Malaysia. From its inception in 2014 until 2017, the ACSJ awards ceremonies have been held in Dewan Datuk Amar Stephen Kalong Ningkan Betong, Sarawak on 21 June 2014, 19 September 2015, 2 September 2016 and 23 September 2017.

List of ceremonies by year

Accolades received by artistes

Anugerah Juara Rentak Ruai (AJARR) - AJARR Awards 

Sarawak music awards organized by Cats FM since 2003. The following is a list of the winner by category.

AJARR 2003

AJARR 2004

AJARR 2009

AJARR 2010

AJARR 2011

AJARR 2012

Anugerah Musik Dayak (AMD) - Dayak Music Awards 

Music awards for Dayak musicians and entertainer in Sarawak organized by Dayak Artistes and Musicians Association (DAMA) since 2008. The following is a list of the winner by category excluding the 2008 AMD results.

AMD 2010

AMD 2012

AMD 2014

AMD 2016

Anugerah Carta Sapa Juara (ACSJ) - ACSJ Awards 

Music awards for Dayak musicians and entertainer in Sarawak organized by Sarawak Radio Televisyen Malaysia since 2014. The following is a list of the winner by category.

ACSJ 2014

ACSJ 2015

ACSJ 2016

ACSJ 2017

Other award ceremonies

Bidayuh Music Festival 

Bidayuh Music Festival presented by the Bidayuh Artistes and Musicians Association (Bama). The event had considered for a music award that would have similar categories to the Anugerah Musik Dayak (AMD) and the first ceremony was held in 2015 in Serian with the support of Serian District Council (SDC).

See also 
 Iban people
 Dayak people

References 

Malaysian music awards
Events in Sarawak